Pseudidothea is a genus of crustaceans belonging to the monotypic family Pseudidotheidae.

The species of this genus are found in southernmost South Hemisphere.

Species:

Pseudidothea hoplites 
Pseudidothea miersi 
Pseudidothea richardsoni 
Pseudidothea scutata

References

Isopoda